Birch Services is a motorway service station located on the M62 motorway between Junction 18 (M60) and Junction 19 Heywood, close to Rochdale and Bury. There are two sides to the service station, the Eastbound services being quite old and the Westbound services being more modern. The services opened in 1972.

History
In September 1989 the services were the location for the murder of Inspector Raymond Codling of the Greater Manchester Police. There is a memorial on the westbound side.

Construction
The contract was awarded to Granada Motorway Limited in late October 1968; Granada operated Heston, Toddington, and Frankley, but Granada decided not to proceed, and it was re-advertised, and Esso took the contract, to open in the summer of 1972. Adverse weather in the winter of 1969 held up construction of the M62 section by 6 months. Birch was meant to open around the same time when the M62 section opened, in early 1971. The site would be 33 acres. It was planned to open the M62 section in early August 1971.

The 13 mile section from Whitefield to the Lancashire-Yorkshire boundary opened on Tuesday 3 August 1971. Birch would open in September 1972. Construction of Birch began in September 1971. Lighting on 30 metre high mast steel columns, each with eight 400W lanterns, was built by Balfour Kilpatrick Installations, who also supplied the 500 lighting columns for the Milnrow to Rockingstone Moss M62 section.

The architect was Challen, Floyd, Slaski and Todd. The main contractor was Shepherd Construction Limited. It cost £1.5m. Underground petrol tanks could hold 180,000 gallons.

Other Esso areas were Washington services, Woolley Edge services, Southwaite Services and Leigh Delamere services.

The 32 acre site opened as Esso Taverna, on Monday 18 December 1972. The eastbound restaurant was open; the westbound restaurant opened 1 January 1973.

Buildings
There were 15 pumps each side, with two, three, four and five star petrol. When it opened, diesel was 37p per gallon. Most staff came from Middleton; there were almost 200 staff, and 75% worked in catering. There was a repair facility on the eastbound side. Dudley Westgate looked after catering and David Wears looked after petrol. There was room for 400 vehicles on each side. Project manager was David Parker of Esso Tavernas.

The colour scheme in the toilets was black, white and powder blue. The two shops were open from 7am to 10pm.

Food
At opening, main meals were served from 11.30am to 3am. The hot drinks machines cost £1,600 each, with six on either side. Each week the site was serving 20,000 meals a week, and about 30,000 drinks. Two sausages, egg and baked beans was 28p, chicken and chips was 55p, steak & kidney pie, chips and carrots was 36p, tea was 5p, and coffee was 7p.

2003 fire
The westbound amenity building was destroyed in a massive fire on 9 October 2003. After losing large sums of cash in a slot machine, Jason New started kicking it to get his money back. He then went to the shop, bought a lighter, and set fire to the machine. By 1am the whole westbound side of the services were alight and evacuated. It took 70 fire-fighters four hours to bring the blaze under control.

Rebuilding
Whilst the site was being rebuilt, temporary facilities were provided. The petrol station, motel and eastbound services were not affected but were evacuated for safety reasons. The new services cater for 242 cars, 120 lorries and 30 coaches. When it was opened, Moto described the new building as being "the most modern on the motorway network".

References

External links 

Moto official site - Birch Services Eastbound

M62 motorway service stations
Moto motorway service stations
Buildings and structures in the Metropolitan Borough of Rochdale
1972 establishments in England
Commercial buildings completed in 1972
Buildings and structures in the United Kingdom destroyed by arson